Caddyshack: Music from the Motion Picture Soundtrack  is a 1980 soundtrack to the film of the same name. It includes original songs from Kenny Loggins  and a film score by Johnny Mandel. It also includes appearances by Journey, Paul Collins & the Beat, and Hilly Michaels. The soundtrack was a moderate success on the charts, peaking at #78 on the Billboard 200.

In 2010, La-La Land Records reissued the soundtrack on CD.

Track listing

Other 
Songs included in the film, but not on the soundtrack are as follows: 
 "Summertime Blues" - Eddie Cochran 
 "Boogie Wonderland" - Earth Wind & Fire ft. The Emotions
 "Waltz of the Flowers" - Pyotr Tchaikovsky
 "The Ballad of the Green Berets" - Barry Sadler 
 "The Gold Diggers' Song (We're in the Money)" - Harry Warren
 "Theme From 'Jaws'"- John Williams
 "The Burning Bush" - Elmer Bernstein
 "Tchaikovsky's 1812 Overture"- Henry Adolph Harmonica Slavonica

Sources 
 https://www.allmusic.com/album/caddyshack-mw0000318909
 https://www.imdb.com/title/tt0080487/soundtrack

1980 soundtrack albums
Columbia Records soundtracks
Comedy film soundtracks